Yattendon Group plc (formerly Yattendon Investment Trust) is a British-based private company owned by the Iliffe family. It has interests in Vancouver, Seattle, agriculture, marinas and local newspaper printing and publishing.

Property
Yattendon owns marinas via its subsidiary MDL Marinas. It also owns large areas of land in West Berkshire.

Media
Yattendon previously owned Channel Television, and sold this to ITV plc in 2011.

Iliffe Media
Iliffe Media publishes 38 local newspapers, magazines, KMFM radio stations and associated online products.

In 2016, the Iliffe family launched a new weekly newspaper and associated media under the banner of the Cambridge Independent following the absorption of its former title, the Cambridge News, into the Trinity Mirror Group after failing to return the title following the Local World venture.

Yattendon's printing press in Milton, Cambridgeshire produces full colour newspapers for a wide range of clients.

Acquisitions 
In January 2017, Yattendon bought 13 newspapers in Lincolnshire and East Anglia from Johnston Press. These include some very long established papers:

 Bury Free Press
 Diss Express
 Fenland Citizen
 Grantham Journal
 Haverhill Echo
 Lincolnshire Free Press
 Lynn News
 Newmarket Journal
 Rutland Times
 Spalding Guardian
 Suffolk Free Press
 Stamford Mercury

See also 
 Edward Iliffe, 1st Baron Iliffe
 Langton Iliffe, 2nd Baron Iliffe

References

External links
 Yattendon Group

Companies based in Berkshire
Mass media companies of the United Kingdom